The 2007–08 Austrian Football First League season was the 34th season of second level league football in Austria. It was the sixth season that it used the name Red Zac First League.

Final standings

Results
Last updated 8 November 2007

Top goal scorers
Last updated 8 November 2007

External links
 RSSSF Link

2. Liga (Austria) seasons
Austria
2007–08 in Austrian football